This table shows an overview of the protected heritage sites in the Walloon town Doische. This list is part of Belgium's national heritage.

|}

See also 
 List of protected heritage sites in Namur (province)
Doische

References
 Belgian heritage register: Direction générale opérationnelle - Aménagement du territoire, Logement, Patrimoine et Energie (DG4)
 www.dglive.be

Doische